Gauthier Biomedical, based in Grafton, Wisconsin, designs and manufactures spinal and orthopedic surgical instruments for OEM (original equipment manufacturers) in the United States and foreign countries.

Gauthier Biomedical was founded in 2000 by Michael Gauthier, who is acting president of the company. Michael and his wife Stacy Gauthier, vice president of Gauthier Biomedical, both attended Marquette University located in Milwaukee, Wisconsin. Gauthier Biomedical works with all grades of stainless steel, aluminum alloys, plastics, phenolic, and silicone.  They are ISO 13485:2003 certified. Gauthier Biomedical is the owner of several patents in medical device technology including the No Play ratcheting mechanism which limits axial and side-to-side “play” or “wobble” between shaft and handle (protected by US Patent Numbers 6,817,458; 6,948,605; 7,014,023; 7,156,216; 7,413,065; and other patents pending).

References 

Medical technology companies of the United States
Surgical instrument manufacturers